One of a Kind is the debut studio album by Swedish singer Pandora, released in Sweden in November 1993 by Virgin Records. The album debuted and peaked at number 12 in Sweden.

Track listing
 "I'm Beginning to Fly" (intro) (Peter Johansson) – 1:25
 "Another Party" (Henrik Andersson, Johasson) – 4:07
 "Trust Me" (Andersson, Martin Ankelius, Johasson) – 3:25
 "Going to the Top" (Andersson, Johasson) – 3:47
 "Come On and Do It" (Andersson, Johasson) – 3:18
 "One of a Kind" (Andersson, Ankelius, Johasson) – 3:47
 "Get Your Chance" (Andersson, Johasson) – 3:45
 "Promise" (Johasson) – 4:27
 "Dizzharmonie" (Andersson, Ankelius) – 4:25
 "Join Me Now" (Andersson, Ankelius, Johasson) – 4:00
 "Something's Gone" (Andersson, Johasson) – 4:47
 "Trust Me" (Club Extended) (Andersson, Akelius, Johasson) – 5:34
 "Come On and Do It" (The Funky Ride Version II) (Andersson, Johasson) – 4:14

Charts

Certifications

Release history

References

1993 debut albums
Pandora (singer) albums
Virgin Records albums